I Monster are an English electronic music duo, composed of the Sheffield based record producers Dean Honer and Jarrod Gosling.

I Monster and its label Twins of Evil are both named after horror films starring Peter Cushing (i.e., I, Monster and Twins of Evil).

History

Formation and These Are Our Children
I Monster formed in 1997 and released their debut album These Are Our Children in 1999. However, due to Honer being involved with hitmakers All Seeing I, it was not until 2001 that they released their first single, "Daydream in Blue", which used a sample of The Gunter Kallmann Choir's version of The Wallace Collection's "Daydream". The song was originally released on 7" on Honer's own record label Cercle Records, which he founded with Add N to (X)'s Barry Seven. It was later re-released with a new mix on Instant Karma (in association with their own label Twins of Evil); which has also released material from Kings Have Long Arms and Mu Chan Clan.  The song also featured on episode 3 of season 1 in the BBC Television television drama Hustle. The track peaked at #20 in the UK Singles Chart in June 2001.

Neveroddoreven
They released their acclaimed second album Neveroddoreven in 2003, which was re-released with a new sleeve in 2005 on Dharma Records. The members are regular guest DJs across the country and have played live shows in London and at various European music festivals. Part of the live band is made up of Fred de Fred and Marion Benoist from The Lovers, on guitar and vocals respectively. Bonus tracks and rarities from "Neveroddoreven" were released on the albums Rare and Remixed (both 2012).

Fast, Cheap and Out of Control
In 2007, I Monster started collaborating with Finnish pop artist, HK119, for her second album.  The resulting project, Fast, Cheap and Out of Control was released in September 2008 on One Little Indian Records, and saw I Monster co-write and co-produce over three quarters of the album. This collaboration came from Dean Honers previous role as a remixer for HK119's debut single, "Pick Me Up", from her debut eponymous album in 2006.

A Dense Swarm of Ancient Stars
In 2009, the band released the follow-up to Neveroddoreven, titled A Dense Swarm of Ancient Stars, their third album.

Credo
In 2011, the band produced The Human League's Credo, its first album in 10 years.

Swarf
In 2013, a collection of rarities from the album A Dense Swarm of Ancient Stars were released on the album Swarf.

Bright Sparks
Their fourth album, Bright Sparks, was released on 26 February 2016.

Bright Sparks Instrumental, an instrumental version of the album, was released on 19 July 2016 on the group's Bandcamp site. Included on this album is a preview track for Bright Sparks Volume Two, which the group have stated will appear in the future.

Discography
Studio albums 
These Are Our Children (1999)
Neveroddoreven (2003)
A Dense Swarm of Ancient Stars (2009)
People Soup (2013)
Bright Sparks (2016)
A Dollop Of HP (2017)

Compilation albums 
Rare (2012)
Remixed (2012)
Swarf (2013)

Instrumental albums
Bright Sparks Instrumental (2016)

Collaborations
 The All Seeing I - Pickled Eggs & Sherbet (1999)
 HK119 - Fast, Cheap and Out of Control (2008)
 Various Artists - The Art Of Chill 6 - Mixed by I Monster (2009)
 Skywatchers - The Skywatchers Handbook (2010)
 The Human League - Credo (producers, 2011)
 Kevin Pearce - Pocket Handkerchief Lane (producers, 2011) 
 The Eccentronic Research Council - 1612 Underture (2012) 
 Kevin Pearce - Matthew Hopkins and the Wormhole - Act Two by Kevin Pearce (Treatments by Dean Honer) (producers, 2013) 
 I Monster / People Soup - I Monster Presents People Soup (2013)

In popular culture

The band's music has also been used in a number of films such as Shaun of the Dead, Riders (Steal), the snowboard video "From ___ with Love" (Mack Dawg Productions), and has been sampled by hip hop artist Lupe Fiasco on his second single, "Daydreamin'". It was used in the Ford Focus ST advertisement in the UK, and was also translated into other languages (for example, Turkish) for use in other European countries. "Daydream in Blue" appeared in the Season 2 premiere of Mr. Robot.

The "Glamour Puss" remix of their song "Hey Mrs." was used in television commercials for Absolut Vodka and the television series Eureka.

Their song "Daydream in Blue" was used in BBC television series Hustle, Series 1, episode 3, also in Welsh public information film Cow and in Apple TV television series Severance, episode 2.

"These Are Our Children" was used several times on the Australian television series Underbelly; and was subsequently released as part of the Underbelly soundtrack. It was also used as background music in episode 5 of the ITV drama Married Single Other. The song "Heaven" was used in the introduction to fifth-season episode "Disturbed" of the TV show Numb3rs.

"Stobart's Blues" was used in the premiere episode of BBC Top Gear'''s fifth season, when James May reviewed the Vauxhall Monaro.

An acoustic version of "Daydream in Blue" was part of the soundtrack of the Brazilian Soap Opera A Dona do Pedaço in 2019'' and used in a Magnum Ruby ice-cream commercial.

References

External links

English electronic music duos
English pop music groups
Musical groups from Sheffield